The 2020 MTV Millennial Awards Brazil were held on September 24, 2020. The show was broadcast live from MTV (Brazil) and had Bruna Marquezine and Manu Gavassi as hosts for the first time. Nominees were announced on August 20, 2020.

Anitta, Bianca Andrade, Lady Gaga and Manu Gavassi were the most awarded artists of the night, with 2 awards each.

Performers

Winners and nominees 
Winners are listed first and highlighted in bold

References

External links
 Official website

Magazine awards
Brazilian awards
2020 music awards